Grand Jury is an American drama television series created by Mort Briskin. The series stars Lyle Bettger and Harold J. Stone. The series aired in syndication from November 21, 1959, to May 23, 1960.

Cast 
Lyle Bettger as Harry Driscoll
Harold J. Stone as John Kennedy
Douglass Dumbrille as Grant
Richard Travis as Thompson 
Ed Prentiss as Russell
Addison Richards as Fullerton

Episodes

References

External links
 

1950s American drama television series
1958 American television series debuts
1960 American television series endings
Black-and-white American television shows
English-language television shows
First-run syndicated television programs in the United States